KNON (89.3 FM) is a non-commercial radio station broadcasting a community radio format. Licensed to Dallas, Texas, it serves the Dallas/Fort Worth Metroplex and is owned by Agape Broadcasting Foundation, Inc. KNON (for NON-commercial) is a non-profit, listener-supported radio station, deriving its main source of income from on-air pledge drives, underwriting or sponsorships by local small businesses, and benefit events. The volunteer disc jockeys play their own music or conduct talk shows.  KNON has a paid staff of four full-time people.

KNON has an effective radiated power (ERP) of 55,000 watts.  It broadcasts using HD Radio technology.  The transmitter is on West Belt Line Road in Cedar Hill, amid the towers for other Dallas-area FM and TV stations.  The studios and offices are on Colt Road in Dallas, off Interstate 635.

Programming
KNON plays a variety of music, including weekly shows featuring Jazz, Blues, Folk, Indie Rock, Alt Country, Classic Country, Rockabilly, Bluegrass, Cajun, Zydeco, Reggae, R&B, Hip Hop, Latin Contemporary, Reggaeton, Tejano, Urban Gospel and Southern Gospel.  Most of the DJs have three-hour shifts, once or twice a week.

Talk programming includes once-a-week shows on workers rights and LGBTQ issues.

History
KNON originally broadcast at 90.9 MHz. Its predecessor on the frequency was KCHU, a non-commercial station that began broadcasting on August 29, 1975.  KCHU operated until August 1977, when it went off the air due to financial shortfalls.

The 90.9 frequency was transferred to Agape Broadcasting as KNON in 1979. The station remained silent through 1980, which was then a license renewal year in Texas.  At the time, radio stations operated on a three-year license cycle with the Federal Communications Commission (FCC). By 1984, Criswell Bible Institute (now Criswell College) had begun operating KCBI-FM from a downtown Dallas rooftop with 1,500 watts on 89.3 MHz. The institute wanted to raise the station's power and height and to relocate to the Cedar Hill tower farm where most Dallas-area FM and TV stations have their transmitters.

By the mid-1980s, a number of groups, among which the Criswell Bible Institute was the most prominent, petitioned the FCC to have the 90.9 FM frequency assigned to another broadcaster.  Criswell had cited past operational deficiencies on KNON's part as justification for the frequency reallocation.  The result was a swap of frequencies between KCBI and KNON in May 1988. The KNON online history museum can be found here.

KNON was picked Best Radio Station in Dallas in 2011 by The Dallas Observer and D-Magazine. In 2012 KNON was picked Best Radio Station for Music by the Dallas Observer.

On the night of October 20, 2019, the KNON studios and offices sustained a direct hit from a tornado, and were heavily damaged. There were no injuries at the station.

See also
List of community radio stations in the United States

References

External links
Official KNON website
KNON's Show Schedule

 DFW Radio/TV History
FCC History Cards for:
KCBI at 89.3 (current KNON license)
the defunct 90.9 license

Community radio stations in the United States
NON
Radio stations established in 1983